Rothia arrosa is a moth of the family Noctuidae. This moth occurs in Madagascar.

References
Jordan, K. 1926a. Some new Agaristidae, with remarks on nomenclature. - Novitates Zoologicae 33:371–378.

Agaristinae
Moths of Madagascar
Moths of Africa
Moths described in 1926